National Pride Projects are a set of infrastructure projects by the government of Nepal based on the proposal by the National Planning Commission.

Projects
 Sikta Irrigation Project 
 Babai Irrigation Project
 Rani Jamara Kulariya Irrigation Project
 Bheri Babai Diversion Multipurpose Project
 Upper Tamakoshi Hydroelectric Project
 Budhigandaki Hydroelectric Project
  West Seti Hydropower Project
 Gautam Buddha International Airport
 Pokhara International Airport
 Nijgadh International Airport
 Pashupati Area Development Project
 Lumbini Area Development Project
  Mid-Hills Pushpalal Highway
 East-West Railway
 Terai Hulaki Marg
 North-South Koshi Corridor
 North-South Kaligandaki Corridor
 North-South Karnali Corridor
 Kathmandu-Terai Expressway
 Melamchi Water Supply Project
 President Chure-Terai Madhesh Conservation Area Program
 Sunkoshi Marin Diversion Project
 Mahakali Irrigation Project

Progress
 Progress 2015
Progress 2020

References

Proposed infrastructure
Nepal-related lists
Infrastructure in Nepal